David Ruffin is the self-titled album from singer David Ruffin. Coming out after Motown refused to put out his proposed third album in 1971 (released as David in 2004), Ruffin was likewise no longer afforded access to "A-list" material and support musicians. This album in many ways was a collaborative effort with Robert E. Miller, who produced the album. Miller also had a hand in composing eight of its tracks. Although the album made it into the US R&B Top Five, it underperformed on the US pop charts, peaking at number 168. Those slipping figures were indicators of the increasing lack of interest from Motown in Ruffin's career.

The songs were arranged by David Van DePitte, with The Andantes singing backing vocals.

Track listing
All tracks composed by Robert Eugene Miller; except where indicated

Side One
"The Rovin' Kind"
"Common Man"
"I'm Just a Mortal Man"
"(If Loving You Is Wrong) I Don't Want to Be Right" (Homer Banks, Carl Hampton, Raymond Jackson)
"There Will Always Be Another Song To Sing"

Side Two
"I Miss You (Part 1)" (Kenny Gamble, Leon Huff)
"Blood Donors Needed (Give All You Can)"
"A Little More Trust"
"Go On With Your Bad Self"
"A Day in the Life of a Working Man" (Robert Miller, David Ruffin)

Personnel
David Ruffin - vocals
The Andantes - backing vocals
Eddie Kendricks - backing vocals on "I Miss You"
David Van De Pitte - arrangements
Technical
John Lewis - recording engineer
Michael Grace - special technical assistance
Jim Britt - photography

Chart history

Singles

References

1973 albums
Motown albums
David Ruffin albums